The bishop of London is the ordinary of the Church of England's Diocese of London in the Province of Canterbury. By custom the Bishop is also Dean of the Chapel Royal since 1723.

The see is in the City of London, where the seat is St Paul's Cathedral, which was founded as a cathedral in 604 and was rebuilt from 1675 following the Great Fire of London (1666).

Third in seniority in the Church of England after the archbishops of Canterbury and York, the bishop is one of five senior bishops who sit as of right as one of the 26 Lords Spiritual in the House of Lords (for the remaining diocesan bishops of lesser rank, seats are attained upon vacancy, determined by chronological seniority). The other four senior bishops are the archbishop of Canterbury, the archbishop of York, the bishop of Durham and the bishop of Winchester.

The bishop's residence is The Old Deanery, Dean's Court, City of London. Previously, Fulham Palace was the residence for over 1000 years, and from the 18th century, the bishop had chambers at London House next to the Bishop's Chapel in Aldersgate Street.

The current (133rd) bishop of London is Sarah Mullally. She was confirmed on 8 March 2018 after acting in post immediately after her canonical election on 25 January 2018. The diocesan bishop of London has had direct episcopal oversight in the Two Cities area (the City of London and the City of Westminster) since the institution of the London area scheme in 1979.

History

The first mention of Christianity in England comes from Tertullian, possibly writing in the early 200s, but the first mention of an implied church in London relates to a Bishop of London, either Restitus or Aldephius, attending the Council of Arles in 314 AD.

The location of Londinium's original cathedral is uncertain. The present structure of St Peter upon Cornhill was designed by Christopher Wren following the Great Fire in 1666 and stands upon the highest point in the area of old Londinium, but possibly more significantly directly above the location of a pagan shrine room (aedes) within the great Roman London basilica. 

There is a medieval tradition which maintains the church was founded by King Lucius in AD 199. If St Peter's was built in the Roman era, it would make the church contemporaneous to the Romano-British church at Silchester, similarly built adjacent to the Roman Basilica and most likely pre-Constantine in age.

Some caution may be exercised in this respect however, as other research suggests it very rare for early English Christian churches to be founded in pagan temples, and that when temples were turned into churches, this occurred later, in the late sixth century onwards. Historians seem to be more confident that early English Christian churches met in private homes, and that some Roman villas also installed places of Christian worship.

Whether the Lucius story is a fiction, or whether there was actually a church deliberately erected over the shrine room is unclear and could only be settled by archaeological exploration under St Peter's. However, it is interesting that whilst four medieval churches were built around the same time on the foundations of the Roman Basilica and forum, the London city authorities in 1417 determined that St Peter's dated back to Roman times, and indeed was the original seat of English Christianity. This suggests there may have been something extra in St Peter's location and longevity which justifies it predating the others.

In 1995, a large and ornate 4th-century church was discovered on Tower Hill, which seems to have mimicked St Ambrose's cathedral in the imperial capital at Milan on a still-larger scale. This possible cathedral was built between 350 and 400 out of stone taken from other buildings, including its veneer of black marble. It is perfectly possible that the stone came from the London basilica and forum, which was demolished and levelled around the same time. The 4th-century was burnt down in the early 5th century.

According to a 12th-century list, which may be recorded by Jocelyne of Furness, there had been 14 "archbishops" of London, claiming London's Christian community was founded in the 2nd century under the legendary King Lucius and his missionary saints Fagan, Deruvian, Elvanus, and Medwin. None of that is considered credible by modern historians.

Following the establishment of the archdiocese of Canterbury by the Gregorian mission, its leader St Augustine consecrated Mellitus as the first bishop to the Saxon kingdom of Essex in 604. (The first bishop of Rochester was also consecrated the same year.) Bede records that Augustine's patron, King Æthelberht of Kent, built a cathedral for his nephew King Sæberht of Essex as part of this mission. This cathedral was constructed in "London" and dedicated to St Paul. Although it's not clear whether Lundenwic or Lundenburh was intended, it is generally assumed the church was located in the same place occupied by the present St Paul's Cathedral atop Ludgate Hill in London. Renaissance rumours that the cathedral had been erected over a Roman temple of the goddess Diana are no longer credited: during his rebuilding of the cathedral following the Great Fire of 1666, Christopher Wren reported discovering no trace of such a structure. Surrey was at times a part of the Kingdom of Essex, and with it the Diocese of London, a situation that changed following a synod at Brentford around 705, reflecting the growing strength of Mercia at the expense of Essex.

Because the bishop's diocese includes the royal palaces and the seat of government at Westminster, he has been regarded as the "King's bishop" and has historically had considerable influence with members of the Royal Family and leading politicians of the day. Since 1748 it has been customary to appoint the Bishop of London to the post of Dean of Her Majesty's Chapels Royal, which has the effect of putting under the bishop's jurisdiction, as dean, several chapels (at the Tower of London and St. James's Palace, among others) which are geographically in the Diocese of London but, as royal peculiars, are officially outside the bishop's jurisdiction as bishop.

The Bishop of London originally had responsibility for the church in the British colonies in North America, although after the American Revolution of 1776, all that remained under his jurisdiction were the islands of the British West Indies. The diocese was further reduced in 1846, when the counties of Essex and Hertfordshire were ceded to the Diocese of Rochester.

The Report of the Commissioners appointed by his Majesty to inquire into the Ecclesiastical Revenues of England and Wales (1835), noted the annual net income for the London see was £13,929.

List of bishops

Romano-British
The dates and names of these early bishops are very uncertain.

Post-Augustinian

Post-Conquest

During the Reformation

Post-Reformation

Assistant bishops
Among those who called Assistant Bishop of London, or coadjutor bishop, were:
1554–: John Bird, deposed Bishop of Chester was appointed suffragan bishop to the Bishop of London
Several coadjutor bishops "in Northern and Central Europe", predecessors of the European Bishops of Fulham
1897–1910 (d.): Alfred Barry, a Canon of Windsor, Rector of St James's Church, Piccadilly and frequently deputised for the Bishop of Marlborough (until 1900), assistant bishop for West London (effectively acting Bishop of Marlborough; 1900–1903), and former Anglican Bishop of Sydney
1916–1933 (d.): Herbert Bury, Bishop in Northern and Central Europe (1911–1926) and incumbent of City churches (1911–d.); former Bishop of British Honduras
1962–1966: Ambrose Reeves, former Anglican Bishop of Johannesburg
1961–1966: Nathaniel Newnham Davis, Warden of United Westminster Almshouses and former Bishop of Antigua
19781981 (res.): Kenneth Woollcombe, assistant for Westminster and former Bishop of Oxford
19761979 (ret.): Kenneth Howell, Minister of St John's Downshire Hill, Hampstead and former Bishop in Chile, Bolivia and Peru
19761987 (ret.): Edward Knapp-Fisher, Canon and Archdeacon of Westminster, Sub-Dean of Westminster (from 1982) and former Bishop of Pretoria

Honorary assistant bishops – retired bishops taking on occasional duties voluntarily – have included:
1929–1934 (d.): William Perrin, Rector of St Andrew Undershaft, bishop for Hampstead deanery and retired Bishop of Willesden
1985–1991 (res.), in Kensington area: Alan Rogers, retired Bishop of Edmonton

References

Bibliography

External links
Diocese of London website
Bishop of London refuses to ban gay Bishop from church service
The papers of the Bishops of London covering 1423–1945 are held at Lambeth Palace Library

 
London, Bishop of
Bishops